Vampire Cheerleaders is an original English-language (OEL) manga series written by Adam Arnold, with art by Michael Shelfer; previously by Shiei, and published by Seven Seas Entertainment. The series follows the adventures of a squad of teenage vampires who really know how to show their school spirit.

Vampire Cheerleaders is the lead story in a supernatural double-feature of Vampire Cheerleaders and the Aoi House spin-off Paranormal Mystery Squad, about a team of cryptid hunters that each has some form of supernatural power, sans the main character.

New updates of Vampire Cheerleaders appeared every Monday, Wednesday, and Friday at Gomanga.com and were run concurrent on the Vampire Cheerleaders Facebook page.

Vampire Cheerleaders made its print debut with 208 pages on 15 March 2011 with the release of the first volume. An ebook was also made available on the Kindle and Nook on the same date.

Vampire Cheerleaders Vol. 2 debuted with 224 pages at #7 on the New York Times Manga Best Sellers list for the week of January 1, 2012. It was originally released on Amazon on December 6, 2011.

On June 5, 2012, the first two print volumes were combined into a single 432-page omnibus containing the first two story arcs of Vampire Cheerleaders and sister series Paranormal Mystery Squad as the Vampire Cheerleaders/Paranormal Mystery Squad Monster Mash Collection. The Monster Mash Collection debuted at No. 9 on the New York Times Manga Best Sellers list for the week of June 24, 2012.  Paranormal Mystery Squad has been incorporated into the archives on the Vampire Cheerleaders website.

Plot
When one of Bakertown High School's vampire cheerleaders discover that one of their own is missing, Lori Thurston and the other senior cheerleaders have no other choice but to induct one of the eleventh grade girls from the 'B Squad' into their vampiric ranks. The girls hold tryouts, choosing sheltered virgin Heather Hartley.

Characters

 Heather Hartley
A naive eleventh grader on Bakertown's 'B Squad' who gets turned into a vampire, opening up a whole new world for her. Brought up in a strict household, her transformation lessens several of her inhibitions such as being dutiful and obedient to her overbearing parents whom she "glamors" into her slaves. Unfortunately she is unable to control her appetite in the first book and sucks the entire Bakertown football team of their blood. She doesn't kill them. But, she weakens them to the point where they won't be able to play in the upcoming game. Thanks to some quick thinking by the A-squad the incident is covered up.
 Lori Thurston
Team captain. The cool and calculating queen bee and mentor of Bakertown High School's coven of "Vampire Cheerleaders." She has maintained her position as head cheerleader for decades, changing her first name and returning every twenty years posing as her "daughter". She does not hesitate to enforce her authority among the others but treats the A-squad as an extended family. Her greatest concern is in maintaining a low profile to avoid trouble and continue living as an immortal cheerleader.
 Zoe Weller
Co-Captain. Constantly at odds with Suki due to the latter apparently killing her boyfriend.
 Suki Taft
Co-Captain (in name only). Constantly at odds with Zoe, apparently due to her killing the latter's boyfriend. Very crude and foul-mouthed.
 Lesley Chandra
Team Treasurer. The mother hen and the most kindly of the A-squad.
 Leonard Duvall
Heather's best friend. Something of a nerd, he suspects that the A-squad are vampires but Heather doesn't believe him until her transformation. He discovers the truth behind the A-squad and confronts them with intentions to expose their secret, but ultimately falls prey to Plan BC "booty call" and becomes a thrall to the A-squad.

Volume list
Vampire Cheerleaders Vol. 1. . Seven Seas Entertainment, 2011
Vampire Cheerleaders Vol. 2. . Seven Seas Entertainment, 2011
Vampire Cheerleaders/Paranormal Mystery Squad Monster Mash Collection. . Seven Seas Entertainment, 2012
Vampire Cheerleaders Must Die!. . Seven Seas Entertainment, 2013
Vampire Cheerleaders in Space...and Time?!. . Seven Seas Entertainment, 2015

References

External links
 Vampire Cheerleaders at Gomanga.com
 Vampire Cheerleaderss first page at Gomanga.com
 Vampire Cheerleaders on Facebook

2010s webcomics
2011 comics debuts
Anime and manga inspired webcomics
Webcomics in print
Webcomics about fandom
Original English-language manga
American comedy webcomics
Seven Seas Entertainment titles
Vampires in comics
Fictional cheerleaders